Çağlar is a Turkish given name for males (mostly) and females and a surname. It may refer to:

Given name
Çağlar Şahin Akbaba (born 1995), Turkish footballer 
Çağlar Birinci (born 1985), Turkish footballer
Çağlar Çorumlu (born 1977), Turkish actor
Çağlar Demirel (born 1969), Kurdish origin Turkish politician
Çağlar Ertuğrul (born 1987), Turkish actor
Çağlar Söyüncü (born 1996), Turkish professional footballer

Surname 
Alkan Çağlar (born 1981), Turkish-Cypriot journalist and a columnist for the weekly (English-Turkish) newspaper Toplum Postası
Alper Çağlar (born 1981), Turkish film director
Bahar Çağlar (born 1988), Turkish professional basketball player
Bakır Çağlar (1941–2011), Turkish jurist, lawyer and academic
Behçet Kemal Çağlar (1908–1969), Turkish composer and politician
Cavit Çağlar (born 1944), Turkish businessman and politician
Ece Ayhan Çağlar (1931–2002), contemporary Turkish poet
Ezgi Çağlar (born 1991), Turkish women's goalkeeper
Reşat Çağlar, diplomat from the Turkish Republic of Northern Cyprus
Sıla Çağlar (born 2004), Turkish chess player

Places
 Çağlar, Elâzığ

Turkish-language surnames
Turkish masculine given names

de:Çağlar